The Women's 50 metre breaststroke swimming events for the 2020 Summer Paralympics took place at the Tokyo Aquatics Centre on 31 August 2021.

Medal summary
The following is a summary of the medals awarded across the 50 metre breaststroke event.

SB3
The SB3 category is for swimmers who have function in their hands and arms but are unable to use their trunk or legs to swim, or they have three amputated limbs.

Heats
The swimmers with the top eight times, regardless of heat, advanced to the final.

Final

References

Swimming at the 2020 Summer Paralympics
2021 in women's swimming